Preiļi (previously also Прели) is a town in Preiļi Municipality in the Latgale region of Latvia. It is also the administrative center of Preiļi Municipality.

History
Preiļi is one of the oldest settlements in Latvia. It was first mentioned in written sources in 1250. The Borch family manor was erected in 1836.

By 1897 Preiļi had a population of 2104. Preiļi has had city rights since 1928. By 1935 there were 1662 people living in Preiļi of whom 50.97% were Jews. After World War II there were less than 1000 people living in Preiļi. During the Soviet era many workers from Russia and Belarus started working in Preiļi and the population reached a peak of 9421 in 1989.

Demographics

Notable people 

 Antonija Vilcāne (born 1956), medieval archaeologist

Twin towns — sister cities

Preiļi is twinned with:

 Hlybokaye, Belarus
 Nizhyn, Ukraine
 Ocnița, Moldova
 Sahil, Azerbaijan
 Utena, Lithuania

See also
List of cities in Latvia

References

External links
 

 
Towns in Latvia
1928 establishments in Latvia
Populated places established in 1928
Preiļi Municipality
Dvinsky Uyezd
Latgale